The women's 5000 metres event at the 2015 African Games was held on 17 September.

Results

References

5000
2015 in women's athletics